John Ewart McGrady (born 30 April 1968) is an English chemist and academic who previously played first-class cricket while a student at the University of Oxford.

The son of the cricket administrator and minor counties cricketer Albert McGrady, he was born in April 1968 at Ryton, County Durham. He later read chemistry at St Catherine's College, Oxford. While studying at Oxford, McGrady played first-class cricket for Oxford University in 1990, making six appearances. Playing as a wicket-keeper, he scored 15 runs in these matches and made two stumpings.

From Oxford, he studied for his doctorate in Australia at the Australian National University. He became a chemistry lecturer at the University of York in 1997, before lecturing at the University of Glasgow in 2006. In 2009 he returned to the University of Oxford, becoming a fellow at New College.

References

External links

1968 births
Living people
People from Ryton, Tyne and Wear
Cricketers from Tyne and Wear
Alumni of St Catherine's College, Oxford
English cricketers
Oxford University cricketers
Australian National University alumni
English chemists
Academics of the University of Oxford
Fellows of New College, Oxford